Penstemon procerus is a species of penstemon known by the common name littleflower penstemon. It is native to western North America from Alaska to California to Colorado, as far east in Canada as Manitoba, where it grows in mountain habitat such as meadows, often in alpine climates. This herbaceous perennial forms mats of herbage with some erect stems reaching about 40 centimeters in maximum height. There are several varieties which vary in morphology, some more decumbent than others, some of which are known commonly as pincushion penstemons for their matted forms. In general, the leaves are lance-shaped to oval, plentiful around the base of the plant with smaller ones arranged in opposite pairs along the stem. The inflorescence is made up of one or more clusters of tubular flowers with lipped, lobed mouths. Each flower is no more than one centimeter in length and is purple to blue in color, often with a white throat. The outside of the flower is generally hairless, while the inside may be lined with white or yellowish hairs.

The Latin specific epithet procerus means "tall".

In cultivation in the UK the cultivar 'Roy  Davidson' has won the Royal Horticultural Society's Award of Garden Merit. It copes with a range of situations, but requires a well-drained medium in full or partial sun.

References

External links
Jepson Manual Treatment
Photo gallery

procerus
Flora of Idaho
Flora without expected TNC conservation status